is a robot fighting game released in 1996 for PlayStation and Sega Saturn. The game was developed by Altron and published by Kokopeli Digital Studios outside Japan. A sequel, Robo Pit 2, was released in Japan on PlayStation in 1997. It was also released in Europe and North America in 2003.

The object of Robo Pit is to build a robot and then fight to the top in arenas that are square in shape. There are many different types of arenas, some with bosses, and the time of day can vary.

There are various types of weapons which include axe, lips, sword, missile and claws. The robots different body parts have different stats that affect its performance. Although all body parts are available from the start, the only way to unlock more weapons is to fight more robot enemies.

Reception

Robo Pit received mixed reviews. Critics generally reviled the one-player mode as mind-numbingly long and easy, but were much more pleased with the two-player mode, though some criticized the lack of support for the PlayStation Link Cable. They particularly praised the ability to create one's own robot and save it to memory card, the winner's claiming of one of their opponent's arms as a prize, and the generally fun quality of the gameplay. Most found the graphics generally lacking in detail, but liked the cute and varied robot designs. The controls were also praised as being accurate and easy to learn.

Reviews for the Saturn port made similar comments, though this time they tended to criticize rather than complement the cuteness of the robots. A review in Next Generation said the Saturn and PlayStation versions are "nearly identical".

References

External links

1996 video games
3D fighting games
Altron games
Multiplayer video games
PlayStation (console) games
Video games about robots
Sega Saturn games
Fighting games
Multiplayer and single-player video games
Video games developed in Japan